The Oslo Open was a women's professional tennis tournament held in Oslo, Norway. The event was part of the Women's Tennis Association (WTA) Tour and was played only once, in 1991. It was classed as a Tier V event, and it was competed on an indoor carpet surface. Catarina Lindqvist won the singles competition and Claudia Kohde-Kilsch and Silke Meier won the doubles; Raffaella Reggi finished runner-up in both events. There was a total prize money on offer of US$100,000. Tournament Director was Ole Jacob Johansen.

Past results

Singles

Doubles

References

Carpet court tennis tournaments
Indoor tennis tournaments
Tennis tournaments in Norway
WTA Tour